Wright's Biscuits (also Wright's (South Shields)) were established in 1790 by L Wright & Son. In the 1930s they implemented intensive factory methods for production and became a national supplier of biscuits, cakes and groceries as well as a leading employer for Tyne and Wear.

Children's illustrator Mabel Lucie Attwell created the Wright's logo, a curly-haired boy called Mischief. The Mischief Club existed for children with members getting a collectable badge.

History

Wright's Biscuits was established in 1790 at Holborn in South Shields to produce ships' biscuits.

After a fire in 1898, completely new buildings were created at Tyne Dock.

The Second World War saw day and night production for the Army. Around 300 employees, mostly women, worked shifts around the clock.

The organization became a public company in 1936. At the first AGM, the company was described as "commenced from nothing only four years ago".

In 1962 J Lyons took control of the Wright's Cakes factory with Wright's Biscuits considering national van sales of cakes to no longer be sufficiently profitable. In the same year Wright's Biscuits bought Kemp Biscuits from Scribbans.

By 1966, due to the losses by Kemp Biscuits Ltd, the growth of Wright's Biscuits was hampered.

In 1972, United Biscuits took over Wright's Biscuits, Kemp Biscuits Ltd and Carr's Carlisle making it part of the giant Cavenham Foods group. In October 1972 the company was put into administration and the factory finally closing in 1973.

The factory was reopened in 1975 under the name of Lowe's for the production of dog biscuits. This ran until 1983 at which time the factory and the chimney (a landmark for Tyne and Wear Dock area) were demolished.

References

1791 establishments in England
Biscuit brands
South Shields
1973 disestablishments in England
Defunct companies based in Tyne and Wear